The Tractors is the self-titled debut studio album by American country music band The Tractors. Released in August 1994 on Arista Records, it set a record for becoming the fastest-selling debut album by a group to achieve Recording Industry Association of America platinum certification in the United States; by the end of the year, it was certified double platinum, and became the highest-selling country album of 1994. The tracks "Baby Likes to Rock It", "Tryin' to Get to New Orleans", and "Badly Bent" were all released as singles. "Baby Likes to Rock It" was the only one to reach the top 40, peaking at number 11 on Hot Country Songs.

Recording the album
Steve Ripley, the Tractors' lead vocalist and guitarist, co-produced the album along with keyboardist/bass vocalist Walt Richmond at The Church Studio in Tulsa, OK.

Track listing

Personnel

The Tractors
Ron Getman – electric guitar, acoustic guitar, slide guitar, steel guitar, Dobro, mandolin, high harmony vocals
Jamie Oldaker – drums, "groove snares", tambourine, percussion
Walt Richmond – Steinway piano, Hammond B–3 organ, accordion, Wurlitzer, clavinet, drums, horns, bass vocals
Steve Ripley – electric guitar, drums, lead vocals
Casey van Beek – bass guitar, low harmony vocals

Additional musicians

"The Tulsa Shuffle"
 J. J. Cale – guitar
 Joe Davis – saxophones
 Jim Keltner – drums
 Glen Mitchell – Hammond B-3 organ
 Bonnie Raitt – slide guitar
 Angelene Ripley – Hammond B-3 organ
 Elvis Ripley – tremolo guitar
 Leon Russell – synthesizer

"Fallin' Apart"
 Ed Richmond – fiddle

"Thirty Days"
 Debbie Campbell – background vocals
 John Crowder – background vocals
 Joe Davis – saxophones
 Ron Morgan – upright bass on intro
 Jim Sweney – background vocals

"I've Had Enough"
 Steve Collier – steel guitar
 Gene Crownaver – steel guitar
 Curly Lewis – fiddles
 Waddy Pass – steel guitar

"The Little Man"
 Rick Morton – fiddle
 Jim Pulte – bass vocals
 Bonnie Raitt – slide guitar
 Angelene Ripley – Hammond B-3 organ
 Elvis Ripley – tremolo guitar

"Baby Likes to Rock It"
 James Burton – "Master of the Telecaster"

"Badly Bent"
 Steve Bagsby – steel guitar
 Curly Lewis – fiddle

"The Blue Collar Rock"
 Ry Cooder – slide guitar
 Jim Keltner – additional drums

"Doreen"
 Eldon Shamblin – guitar

"Settin' the Woods on Fire"
None

"Tryin' to Get to New Orleans"
 Joe Davis – horns

"The Tulsa Shuffle (Revisited)"
 Junior Markham & the Tulsa All-Stars
 Junior Markham – harmonica
 Jimmy Karstein – drums
 Chuck Blackwell – drums
 Chuck Browning – drums
 David Teegarden – drums
 Steve Hickerson – guitar
 Tommy Tripplehorn – guitar
 Glen Mitchell, Larry Bell, Carl Bickhardt, Dick Sims, Angelene Ripley, Ed Robinson – Hammond B-3 organs
 Steve Allen, Rick Beilke, Mike Bruce, Mark Bruner, Jim Byfield, Robert Coggins, Jon Crowder, Gary Cundiff, Jim Edwards, Richard Feldman, Huey Flannery, Ron Flynt, Michael Garrett, Gary Gilmore, Doc James, Roger Linn, Steve Pryor, Jim Pulte, Gordon Shryock, "Skee", Roger Tillison, Don White – guitars
 Chuck DeWalt, Bill Belknap, Rich Brown, Jim Keltner – additional drums
 Stacey Grant – trombone
 Danny Mayo – "life observations and noises"
 Ron Morgan – bass guitar riffs
 Bonnie Raitt – slide guitar
 Charlene Ripley – trumpet
 Pat "Taco" Ryan – saxophone
 Leon Russell – MIDI
 Jim Strader – bass guitar licks
 Spencer Sutton – piano

Additional production and engineering
Allen Brown – management
Don Cobb – digital editing
Ron Getman – engineering
Maude Gilman – art direction
Carlos Grier – digital editing
Señor McGuire – photography
Denny Purcell – mastering
Walt Richmond – production, engineering, photography
Angelene Ripley – engineering
Elvis Ripley – engineering
Steve Ripley – production, engineering, design, original art

Charts

Weekly charts

Year-end charts

References

External links
[ The Tractors] at Allmusic

1994 debut albums
Arista Records albums
The Tractors albums